"Love (Sweet Love)" is a song recorded by British girl group Little Mix. It was released on 3 September 2021 through RCA Records, as a single in support of their first greatest hits album Between Us. The single was written by group members Leigh-Anne Pinnock and Jade Thirlwall, along with Lauren Aquilina, MNEK and Sakima; the latter two also produced the song.

"Love (Sweet Love)" was met with generally positive reviews from critics, with praise given to their vocal performance. Described as a pop song with elements of synth-pop and soul music, with lyrics that explores themes of female empowerment, independence, and self-love. On the UK Singles Chart it reached number 33, becoming Little Mix's 31st top 40 single. It also reached the top forty in Ireland, Croatia, Latvia and Hungary. Little Mix performed the track for the first time during The Confetti Tour, in 2022.

Background and release
On 29 August 2021, Little Mix teased the song by posting a short snippet of the music video on their social media accounts. The song was announced on 30 August 2021, with a new snippet of the music video released the next day. On 2 September 2021, a snippet of the song was released on the online video-sharing platform, TikTok, a day before the official release of the song. "Love (Sweet Love)" was released on 3 September 2021, along with an accompanying music video. This marked the group's first official song as a trio after Jesy Nelson's departure from the group in 2020.

Composition 
"Love (Sweet Love)" is a pop song written by group members Jade Thirlwall and Leigh-Anne Pinnock, with MNEK, Sakima and Lauren Aquilina. The members of Morcheeba, Ross Godfrey, Paul Godfrey and Skye Edwards, were also given a writing credit, as the song samples Morcheeba's 2000 track "Love Sweet Love". MNEK and Sakima also handled the production. The song runs for a total length of three minutes and forty seconds. Lyrically, the song discusses independence, female empowerment, and self-love, with the lyrics "I don't need your love to love me. Need my own celebration, yeah, Solo stimulation, yeah, Kiss my imagination. I don't need your love to love me" included in the song.

Music video
The music video was released on 3 September 2021, the same day as the song's release. It was directed by Samuel Douek, who also directed the music video for the group's previous singles, "Confetti" and "Heartbreak Anthem". In the video, the group appears as "gold-adorned goddesses" sat on thrones and dressed in gold gowns with golden headpieces, surrounded by worshippers in a garden greenhouse.

In an Instagram post, Douek said that "The concept was inspired by the Pre-Raphaelite art movement and the lesser known Sisterhood that romanticised nature and emboldened women through painting". He continued by explaining that he wanted to "celebrate Little Mix as the regal queens they are; unimpressed by a cohort of Knights that vie for their attention". Douek then described the song as a "a celebration of self-love and female empowerment" and admired Edwards and Pinnock for their performance in the video, as they were pregnant at the time the video was shot. The video also contains choreography by Khloe Dean and the art direction was directed by Furmaan Ahmed.

Critical reception
Lyndsey Havens from Billboard added the song to her ten cool pop new songs list and described it as "the kind of punchy, soulful pop stompers that fans have come to crave from Little Mix".

Rollingstone India, added that "Love (Sweet Love)” encapsulates the group’s long-established personas as icons of empowerment and self-love: “I been spendin’ time on everybody else/ It’s time I did it for me (Love, sweet love).” The synth-pop track employs Little Mix’s arsenal of harmonies and vocal variations, giving the single a fresh, anthemic feel."

Conor Clark from Gay Times, said "Love (Sweet Love) is about love and passion which features vocal harmonies from the trio."

Track listing
Digital download and streaming
 "Love (Sweet Love)" – 3:40

Digital download and streaming – acoustic
 "Love (Sweet Love)" (acoustic version) – 3:44

Digital download and streaming – Dopamine remix
 "Love (Sweet Love)" (Dopamine remix) – 4:01

Digital download and streaming – Emily Nash remix
 "Love (Sweet Love)" (Emily Nash remix) – 3:18

Digital download and streaming – Shane Codd remix
 "Love (Sweet Love)" (Shane Codd remix) – 3:18

Digital EP
 "Love (Sweet Love)" (Dopamine remix) – 4:01
 "Love (Sweet Love)" (Emily Nash remix) – 3:18
 "Love (Sweet Love)" (Shane Codd remix) – 3:18
 "Love (Sweet Love)" (acoustic version) – 3:44

Charts

Release history

References

2021 singles
2021 songs
Little Mix songs
RCA Records singles
Songs written by MNEK
Songs written by Lauren Aquilina